The 2018 Broome flood was a severe flood that occurred in January and February 2018 in and around Broome in the Kimberley region of Western Australia.

The flooding was triggered following record breaking rainfall. Broome received  of rainfall in the first two months of 2018, the equivalent of two years worth.

The rainfall was caused by Cyclone Joyce, which struck Broome on 12 January 2018. Another tropical low struck the area two weeks later, which delivered further rains. Cyclone Kelvin then hit on 16 February.

Dampier Creek and other waterways burst their banks and inundated low-lying areas. The town became isolated when the Great Northern Highway was cut to the south and east of the town. Some residents of surrounding areas had to be evacuated and supplies had to be air dropped to isolated communities.

An area of the Kimberley about the size of Victoria was isolated once the highway was cut.

See also

2017–18 Australian region cyclone season

References

Broome flood
2018 Broome flood
Floods in Western Australia
Broome, Western Australia
2018 disasters in Australia
January 2018 events in Australia
February 2018 events in Australia